Tall Kuhak (also Romanized as Tall Kūhak; also known as Tall Gūk) is a village in Anarestan Rural District, Chenar Shahijan District, Kazerun County, Fars Province, Iran. At the 2006 census, its population was 332, in 75 families.

References 

Populated places in Chenar Shahijan County